Tyler Schultz (born March 29, 1994) is an American shot putter.

He won a silver medal at the 2011 World Youth Championships in Athletics.

Schultz attended Custer High School, where he also played varsity football and basketball. In April 2012, he broke the South Dakota state record in shot put, throwing  at the Custer Invitational track and field meet.

Schultz committed to Colorado State University.

He was a USA Today All-American track and field selection in 2012.

References

External links

DyeStat profile for Tyler Schultz

1994 births
Living people
People from Custer, South Dakota
American male shot putters
Sportspeople from South Dakota